Chrysotoxum fasciatum is a species of Holarctic hoverfly.

Identification
External images
For terms see Morphology of Diptera
Wing length 8-10·25 mm. Orange stigma. No dark wing spot. Apical antennomere longer than antennomeres 1 and 2 together. Abdomen arched, shortly ovate and thick in side view. Scutellum yellow with a darker centre.

Keys and accounts 
Coe R.L. (1953) Syrphidae 
Van Veen, M. (2004) Hoverflies of Northwest Europe 
Van der Goot,V.S. (1981) De zweefvliegen van Noordwest - Europa en Europees Rusland, in het bijzonder van de Benelux
Bei-Bienko, G.Y. & Steyskal, G.C. (1988) Keys to USSR insects. Diptera

Distribution
Ireland through Europe  then East across the Palearctic to Siberia, Kamchatka and Japan. Nearctic Manitoba westwards

Biology
Habitat is wetlands and deciduous and conifer woodlands including fen carr, raised bogs, along stream edges. Also found in unimproved grassland and heath and Betula and Salix scrub. 
Flowers visited include yellow composites, white umbellifers, Calluna, Frangula alnus, Hypochoeris, Leontodon, Leucojum aestivum, Ligustrum, Luzula sylvatica, Potentilla erecta, Ranunculus, Rubus, Salix repens, Sorbus aucuparia. The flight period is May to September, with peaks in June and August.

References

External links
Biolib

Insects described in 1764
Diptera of North America
Diptera of Europe
Syrphinae
Taxa named by Otto Friedrich Müller